The 2015 Faroe Islands Cup was the 61st edition of Faroe Islands domestic football cup. It started on 28 March and ended with the final on 29 August 2015. Víkingur were the defending champions, having won their fourth cup title the previous year, and successfully defended their title, qualifying for the first qualifying round  of the 2016–17 UEFA Europa League.

Only the first teams of Faroese football clubs were allowed to participate. The Preliminary round involved clubs from 2. deild, 3. deild and one from 1. deild. The remaining teams from 1. deild and all of the Effodeildin entered the competition in the First round.

Participating clubs

TH – Title Holders

Round and draw dates

Preliminary round
Two clubs from 2. deild and 1 from 3. deild and 1. deild entered this round. The draw was made on 9 March and the matches took place on 28 March and 1 April.

|}

First round
All ten clubs from Effodeildin, four from 1. deild and the two winners of Preliminary round entered this round. These matches were played on 6 April.

|}

Quarterfinals
The draw was made on 13 April and the matches were played on 21 and 22 April.

|}

Semifinals
The draw was made on 27 April. These matches were played over two legs on 21 May, 3 June and 4 June.

|}

Final

Top goalscorers

References

External links
Cup in Faroe Soccer

Faroe Islands Cup seasons
Cup
Faroe Islands Cup